Hines Interests Limited Partnership is a privately held company that invests in and develops real estate.

The company has developed, redeveloped or acquired 1,450 properties, comprising over 485 million square feet. The company currently manages 622 properties comprising 256 million square feet. The company has a presence in 240 cities in 27 countries.

History
The company was founded in Houston in 1957 by Gerald D. Hines.

In 1966, the company signed a lease with Royal Dutch Shell as the anchor tenant of a 50-story building it was constructing.

In March 2006, Hines Real Estate Investment Trust acquired 321 N. Clark, an 897,000 square foot office building in Chicago for $247.3 million.

In December 2006, a subsidiary of Hines Real Estate Investment Trust acquired a portfolio of 9 buildings in Redmond, Washington for $217 million.

In November 2008, Hines Real Estate Investment Trust acquired a 70% interest in 12 shopping centers owned by Weingarten Realty Investors.

In July 2009, a partnership of the company and Sterling surrendered a 542,000 square foot office building in San Francisco to its lenders.

In October 2010, Hines Global REIT acquired an office tower in Minneapolis for $180 million.

In December 2010, the company sold its 2% interest in 9 buildings including Safeco Plaza (Seattle) to its joint venture partner, CalPERS.

In April 2011, the company began development of CityCenterDC on the site of the former convention center in Washington D.C.

In August 2012, a subsidiary of Hines Global REIT acquired the headquarters of Old Navy in San Francisco for $180 million.

In May 2013, the company sold a building in Washington D.C. to Liberty Property Trust for $133.5 million.

In November 2013, a team led by the company was chosen as the master developer of the Walter Reed Army Medical Center.

In December 2013, Hines Global REIT acquired a property in Washington, D.C. for $141.9 million.

In April 2016, in partnership with Welltower, the company acquired a site in Midtown Manhattan and began development of a 15-story senior living facility.

In August 2016, a subsidiary of Hines Real Estate Investment Trust sold a property in South Florida for $27.59 million.

In February 2016, the company acquired a 345,000 square foot office complex in North Bethesda, Maryland from JBG Smith.

In June 2016, the company announced that Hines Real Estate Investment Trust Inc. would liquidate.

In November 2016, Hines Real Estate Investment Trust sold 7 office properties on the West Coast of the United States to an affiliate of The Blackstone Group for $1.162 billion, sold an office property in Bellevue, Washington to an affiliate of AEW Capital Management for $193 million, and sold the Wells Fargo Center (Sacramento), the tallest building in Sacramento, Starwood Capital Group for $175.5 million. The company also began construction of a 327,000 square foot development in Houston.

In March 2017, the company, in partnership with Oaktree Capital Management, acquired a property in the East Bay (San Francisco Bay Area) for $108.9 million. The company also opened a 24-story, 233-unit luxury apartment complex in Houston.

In March 2017, the company acquired a 2.2 million square foot distribution center in La Porte, Texas from BlackRock.

In May 2017, the company announced plans for a 600,000 square foot mixed-use development in Miami. The company also announced plans for T3 West Midtown and Atlantic Yards, 700,000 square feet of developments in Atlanta in partnership with Invesco.

In July 2017, Hines Global REIT sold an apartment complex in Miami for $100 million.

In June 2019, Hines partnered with the Abu Dhabi Investment Authority (ADIA) to fund Conscient Infra's construction of an apartment complex: Conscient Hines Elevate. in Gurgaon for INR 400 crore.

In August 2020, Hines partnered with Henderson Park Capital to acquire a 71,000 square meter site in Athens, Greece, to be developed into a residential-for-sale complex.

In December 2020, Hines formed a joint venture with the National Pension Service of Korea to focus on build-to-core properties in the U.S.

In November 2021, Hines acquired the historic Utah Pantages Theatre for $0. The city of Salt Lake signed the property over to Hines with an agreement to include affordable housing in the 31 story apartment building that was planned to be built in place of the Pantages Theatre. Demolition began on the building’s exterior in April 2022, despite the current lawsuits filed by members of the community in an effort to save the historic theatre.

References

 
American companies established in 1957
Real estate companies established in 1957
Real estate companies of the United States
Companies based in Houston
Financial services companies of the United States
1957 establishments in Texas
Financial services companies established in 1957